Nefarious may refer to:

People
 Charles Lescewicz, bassist for the band Macabre, known as Nefarious
 X-Raided (born 1974), American rapper once credited under the pseudonym Nefarious

Fictional characters
 Count Nefarious, a Toonstruck character
 Doctor Nefarious, a Ratchet & Clank character
 Doctor Nefarious Tropy, a Crash Bandicoot character

Entertainment
 Nefarious (video game), a 2017 video game
 Nefarious: Merchant of Souls, a documentary film

Music
 Nefarious (EP), an indie rock album
 "Nefarious" (song), a 1996 indie rock song